Jessel Mark Araula Magsayo (born June 22, 1995) is a Filipino professional boxer who held the WBC featherweight title in 2022.

As of March 2022, Magsayo is ranked as the second best featherweight in the world by The Ring (behind Joshua Destor) and the third best by the TBRB and BoxRec.

Amateur career
Magsayo began boxing when he was just 8 years old and by the time he had turned professional he had fought in around 200 amateur contests and was 4-time amateur boxing champion at the annual Amateur Boxing Association of the Philippines (ABAP) national tournaments. In those 4 tournaments he claimed the title of "Best Boxer" twice.

Professional career 
Magsayo made his professional debut against Melton Sandal on May 25, 2013. He won the fight by a first-round knockout. He amassed a 10-0 record during the next two years, before being scheduled to face Rafael Reyes for the vacant IBF Youth featherweight title. He won the fight by a fifth-round technical knockout. Magsayo was scheduled to defend his IBF Youth title against Yardley Suarez on July 11, 2015. He won the fight by a first-round knockout.

Magsayo was scheduled to face Eduardo Montoya for the vacant WBO Youth featherweight title on February 27, 2016. He won the fight by unanimous decision. Magsayo made his first WBO Youth title defense against Chris Avalos on April 23, 2016. He won the fight by a sixth-round technical knockout. Magsayo was scheduled to make his second title defense against Ramiro Robles on September 24, 2016. He won the fight by unanimous decision.

Magsayo was scheduled to fight Issa Nampepeche in a non-title bout on April 29, 2017. He won the fight by a first-round knockout. Magsayo was afterwards made his third WBO Youth title defense against Daniel Diaz on July 8, 2017. He won the fight by a first-round technical knockout. Magsayo made his fourth and final WBO Youth title defense against Shota Hayashi on November 25, 2017. He won the fight by unanimous decision.

On May 25, 2017, Magsayo's promotional contract with the ALA group expired. On June 4, 2017, it was announced that Magsayo had signed with the Now Boxing Promotions.

Magsayo returned from a 17-month absence from the sport to face Erick Deztroyer on April 12, 2019. He won the fight by a fourth-round knockout. Magsayo challenged Panya Uthok for the WBC-ABC featherweight title in his next fight, which was scheduled for August 29, 2019. He won the fight by unanimous decision.

Magsayo vs. Cruz 
Magsayo was scheduled to face Rigoberto Hermosillo on October 4, 2020. He won the fight by split decision. Magsayo was next scheduled to face Pablo Cruz on April 10, 2021. He won the fight by a fourth-round technical knockout.

Magsayo vs. Ceja 
Magsayo faced Julio Ceja in a WBC featherweight title eliminator on August 21, 2021 on the undercard of Manny Pacquiao vs. Yordenis Ugás, with the winner of the bout earning the right to challenge the reigning champion Gary Russell Jr. Ceja was ranked #12 by the WBC at featherweight. He won the fight by a tenth-round knockout that was selected as the Premier Boxing Champions Knockout of the Year 2021.

WBC featherweight champion

Magsayo vs. Russell Jr 
On September 21, 2021, the WBC ordered Gary Russell Jr. to defend his featherweight title against Magsayo. The title bout was scheduled as the main event of a Showtime broadcast card, which took place at the Borgata in Atlantic City, New Jersey on January 22, 2022. Despite being the underdog Magsayo won his first world title by majority decision. Two judges scored the fight 115–113 for Magsayo, while the third judge scored the fight as an even 114–114 draw. Magsayo ends Gary Russell's seven-year title reign and became the new WBC featherweight champion expressing his win saying “This is a dream come true,” “This was my dream since I was a kid, since I was an amateur. And now I’m champion. This is my dream.”

Professional boxing record

Filmography

See also
List of world featherweight boxing champions
List of Filipino boxing world champions

References

External links

Mark Magsayo - Profile, News Archive & Current Rankings at Box.Live

1995 births
Living people
Filipino male boxers
Boxers from Bohol
People from Tagbilaran
World Boxing Council champions
World featherweight boxing champions
Featherweight boxers